The 16093 / 16094 Gomti Sagar Express is an Express train belonging to Indian Railways Southern Railway zone that runs between  and  in India.

It operates as train number 16093 from Chennai Central to Lucknow Charbagh and as train number 16094  in the reverse direction serving the states of Tamil Nadu, Andhra Pradesh, Telangana, Maharashtra, Madhya Pradesh and Uttar Pradesh.

Coaches
The 16093 / 94 Gomti Sagar Express has three AC 3 Tier, 8 Sleeper class, six General Unreserved & two SLR (seating with luggage rake) coaches and two high-capacity parcel van coaches. It does not carry a pantry car.

As is customary with most train services in India, coach composition may be amended at the discretion of Indian Railways depending on demand.

Service

As the average speed of the train is slightly above , as per railway rules, its fare includes a Superfast surcharge.

Routing

Traction
As the route is fully electrified, an Erode or Arakkonam-based WAP-4 locomotive powers the train to its destination.

References

External links
16093 Gomti Sagar Express at India Rail Info
16094 Gomti Sagar Express at India Rail Info

Named passenger trains of India
Transport in Chennai
Rail transport in Tamil Nadu
Rail transport in Andhra Pradesh
Rail transport in Telangana
Rail transport in Maharashtra
Rail transport in Madhya Pradesh
Passenger trains originating from Lucknow
Express trains in India